Roberto Gazzei (born 5 February 1957) is an Italian former sailor. He competed in the Flying Dutchman event at the 1980 Summer Olympics.

References

External links
 

1957 births
Living people
Italian male sailors (sport)
Olympic sailors of Italy
Sailors at the 1980 Summer Olympics – Flying Dutchman
People from Piombino
Sportspeople from the Province of Livorno